The 2012–13 season was Stranraer's first season back in the Scottish Second Division. Stranraer also competed in the Challenge Cup, League Cup and the Scottish Cup. They were due to play in their fourth consecutive season in the Scottish Third Division, having been relegated from the Scottish Second Division at the end of the 2008–09 season. On 16 July 2012, it was confirmed that Stranraer would be promoted to the Scottish Second Division to fill the vacancy's left by Dundee's promotion to the Scottish Premier League and Airdrie United's promotion to the Scottish First Division. This was to fill the slot vacated by Rangers, who were voted into the Scottish Third Division following their liquidation.

Summary

Season
Stranraer finished eighth in the Scottish Second Division. They reached the first round of the Challenge Cup, the first round of the League Cup and the fourth round of the Scottish Cup.

Management
Stranraer began the season under the management of Keith Knox. On 22 October 2012, Knox was sacked by the club following unacceptable results, with Knox's assistant Stephen Aitken taking over as interim manager following his departure. After the Forfar Athletic match on 27 October 2012, Aitken was given the manager's job on a permanent basis.

Results & fixtures

Second Division

Scottish Challenge Cup

Scottish League Cup

Scottish Cup

Player statistics

Squad 
Last updated 12 May 2013 

|}

Disciplinary record
Includes all competitive matches.
Last updated 12 May 2013

Team statistics

League table

Division summary

Transfers

Players in

Players out

References

Stranraer F.C. seasons
Stranraer